The Sumgayit FK 2017-18 season was Sumgayit's seventh Azerbaijan Premier League season, and eight season in their history. It is their second full season with Samir Abbasov as manager, finishing the season in fifth place whilst also reaching the Semifinals of the Azerbaijan Cup.

Squad

Transfers

Summer

In:

Out:

Winter

In:

Out:

Friendlies

Competitions

Azerbaijan Premier League

Results summary

Results

League table

Azerbaijan Cup

Squad statistics

Appearances and goals

|-
|colspan="14"|Players who left Sumgayit during the season:

|}

Goal scorers

Disciplinary record

References

Azerbaijani football clubs 2017–18 season
Sumgayit FK seasons